Linnunrata eXtra (previously Linnunrata and Space Express) is an indoor roller coaster located at Linnanmäki in Helsinki, Finland. Originally in 2000–2003 it was known as Space Express, but when Linnanmäki started a new naming policy in 2004, using only Finnish names for its rides, the ride was renamed Linnunrata. Linnunrata means Milky Way in Finnish ( Bird's track/orbit/route).

When inside, to get to the roller coaster, you first walk through some space station-style corridors. The actual ride has an outer space style, starting by flashing bright LED lights. The track itself is lined with space-themed miniature models. The ride was renewed for the 2016 season, with the addition of virtual reality headsets that you can wear on board if you wish. The name of the ride was changed to Linnunrata eXtra.

In 2018, two new options were added in addition to the original space adventure: Kauhujen taival (the Flight of Horrors) and Liitolentomatka (the Gliding Flight). When you step on the ride, once you put on the headsets, you can choose the video you want.

The roller coaster is built inside the water reservoir of a former water tower, and for the time being is the only indoor roller coaster ride in Finland. The design and production was by APW Group.

References 

Roller coasters in Finland
Linnanmäki
Roller coasters introduced in 2000
Outer space in amusement parks